Cell Communication & Adhesion (formerly Cell Adhesion & Communication) is an academic journal that publishes review articles on intercellular communication, intercellular junctions and families of adhesion receptors and counter receptors from diverse biological systems. It is published by Informa Healthcare.

Core therapeutic areas 

 Intercellular communication
 Intercellular junctions
 Receptor-based cell recognition & signaling

Cell Communication & Adhesion is owned by Informa plc

Regional editors 
Pamela Cowin, PhD and Carien Niessen, PhD and Alpha Yap, MBBS, PhD, FRACP are the regional editors of Cell Communication & Adhesion.

Publication format 
Cell Communication & Adhesion publishes six issues per year in simultaneous print and online editions.

Cited articles

 An update on connexin genes and their nomenclature in mouse and man - Sohl, G; Willecke, K
 Identification of cells expressing Cx43, Cx30, Cx26, CX32 and Cx36 in gap junctions of rat brain and spinal cord - Rash, JE; Yasumura, T; Davidson, KGV; et al.
 Connexin-43 interactions with ZO-1 and alpha-and beta-tubulin - Giepmans, BNG; Verlaan, I; Moolenaar, WH
 Connexin channels, connexin mimetic peptides and ATP release - Le

References

External links
 Cell Communication & Adhesion homepage of Cell Communication & Adhesion

Biology journals
Publications established in 1993